Nicola Bartolini (born 7 February 1996) is an Italian artistic gymnast. He is the 2021 World Champion and 2021 European bronze medalist on floor exercise.  Bartolini's early career was plagued with injury as a shoulder injury and subsequent surgery made him unable to compete at the 2016 Olympic Games.

Gymnastics career

2014 
Bartolini competed at the 2014 European Championships in the junior division.  He helped Italy finish fifth as a team and individually he finished eighth in the all-around and on floor exercise and fifth on vault.

Bartolini competed at the 2014 World Championships where he helped Italy finish 13th as a team during qualifications.  He did not advance to any individual finals.

2015–18 
Between 2015 and 2018 he participated in the 2015 World Championships but injuries prevented him from taking part in Rio 2016 and other competitions.

2019
He took part in the European Championships 2019 and finished eighth on floor exercise and sixth on the vault.  In 2019 he underwent shoulder surgery for a second time.

2021
He took part in the European Championships 2021  where he won the bronze medal at the floor event. In October he won the gold medal in the floor event at the World Artistic Gymnastics Championships 2021 becoming the first Italian to do so.

2022

In August, Bartolini competed at the European Championships, where he finished tenth in the all-around. Additionally, he qualified to the floor final in first place, and helped Italy qualify to the team final.  During the team final he helped Italy win the silver medal behind Great Britain and he placed fourth on floor exercise.  Bartolini next competed at the World Championships where he helped Italy finish in fourth place.  Individually he placed fifth on floor exercise.  Bartolini next competed at the Swiss Cup alongside Martina Maggio.  They finished second behind the American duo of Yul Moldauer and Addison Fatta.

Competitive history

References 

Living people
1996 births
Italian male artistic gymnasts
World champion gymnasts
Medalists at the World Artistic Gymnastics Championships
Mediterranean Games gold medalists for Italy
Mediterranean Games silver medalists for Italy
Mediterranean Games medalists in gymnastics
Gymnasts at the 2022 Mediterranean Games